State Route 128 (SR 128) is a  state highway that runs south-to-north (with two diagonal sections) through portions of Macon, Taylor, and Crawford counties in the west-central part of the U.S. state of Georgia.

Route description

SR 128 begins at an intersection with SR 26/SR 49/SR 49 Truck, southwest of Oglethorpe, in Macon County. SR 49/SR 128 head concurrently to the northeast, intersecting SR 128 Bypass, past Oglethorpe Cemetery, and to an intersection with SR 90. At this intersection, SR 49 north turns onto SR 90 east (Chatham Street), while SR 90 west/SR 128 north turn northwest. Just prior to leaving town is a second intersection with SR 128 Bypass. A little ways north of town, the two highways split, and SR 128 passes through part of Whitewater State Park. The road passes through rural areas of the county, and has a short concurrency with SR 127. Then, it crosses into Taylor County, and passes through Reynolds. In town is an intersection with SR 96/SR 540 (Marion Street). Just before leaving the county, it meets the eastern terminus of SR 137. Shortly to the northeast is the Benjamin Hawkins Bridge over the Flint River, which marks the Taylor–Crawford county line. SR 128 heads northeast into Roberta, where it meets its northern terminus, an intersection with US 341/SR 7 (South Dugger Avenue).

SR 128 is not part of the National Highway System, a system of roadways important to the nation's economy, defense, and mobility.

Major intersections

Bannered route

State Route 128 Bypass (SR 128 Byp.) is a  bypass route that exists entirely within the south central part of Macon County, along the western edge of Oglethorpe.

It begins just southwest of Oglethorpe, at an intersection with the SR 128 mainline (Chatham Street). It briefly passes through a corner of the town, and curves to the northwest, meeting Jake Smith Road/West Cuyler Street. The road continues to curve to the northeast and re-enters the town. SR 128 Byp. continues to the northeast to Coogle Road/Reynolds Street. It intersects Smith Road and Tookes Drive, before it meets its northern terminus, a second intersection with the SR 128 mainline (North Randolph Street). At its southern end, it is signed as "SR 128 Truck Bypass"; while at its northern end, it is signed as "SR 128 Truck Route".

SR 128 Bypass is not part of the National Highway System, a system of roadways important to the nation's economy, defense, and mobility.

See also

References

External links

 Georgia Roads (Routes 121 - 140)

128
Transportation in Macon County, Georgia
Transportation in Taylor County, Georgia
Transportation in Crawford County, Georgia